In Nepal, the grade system is divided into different ways.

The above grading system refers to the Secondary Education Examination (SEE) previously called School leaving Certificate (SLC) examinations when it was implemented, held at the end of at grade 10. It is administered by the Department of Education under the Ministry of Education and Sports, Nepal. Different grading systems are currently being implemented by different universities and education boards.

See also

 Secondary Education Examination (Nepal)
 School Leaving Certificate (Nepal)

References

Nepal
Grading
Grading